Patricia J. DeVaney (born October 30, 1968) is an associate justice of the South Dakota Supreme Court, appointed by Governor Kristi Noem in 2019. She became the 52nd member of the court, succeeding the seat vacated by the death of Justice Steven L. Zinter.

Early life and education
She graduated summa cum laude from the University of South Dakota in Vermillion, South Dakota, in 1990, and from the University of Virginia School of Law in 1993.

Legal career and state judicial service

After graduating law school, DeVaney served in the state attorney general’s office from 1993 to 2012 as a trial lawyer and an appellate lawyer.

In 2012, DeVaney was appointed as a Circuit Court Judge by Governor Dennis Daugaard.  She served as a Circuit Court Judge until her elevation to the South Dakota Supreme Court in 2019.

South Dakota Supreme Court 

On April 4, 2019, Governor Kristi Noem appointed DeVaney to the South Dakota Supreme Court, to the seat vacated by the death of Justice Steven Zinter. She was sworn in on May 23, 2019.

References 

1968 births
Living people
21st-century American judges
21st-century American women judges
American women lawyers
American lawyers
Justices of the South Dakota Supreme Court
People from Miller, South Dakota
University of South Dakota alumni
University of Virginia School of Law alumni